Jason Shirley (born September 30, 1985) is a former American football defensive tackle. He was drafted by the Cincinnati Bengals in the fifth round of the 2008 NFL Draft. He played college football at Fresno State. He is currently coaching youth football in Southern California. He was also a member of the Seattle Seahawks, Carolina Panthers, Indianapolis Colts, Washington Redskins, Arizona Rattlers and Los Angeles Kiss.

Professional career

Cincinnati Bengals
Due to a lack of depth on the offensive line, Shirley switched from defensive tackle, the position he played for his first two NFL seasons, to offensive guard during 2009 training camp. Shirley was waived by the Cincinnati Bengals on September 5, 2009. He was signed to a reserve/future contract on January 11, 2010. He was released on September 3, 2011.

Seattle Seahawks
Shirley signed with the Seattle Seahawks on October 17, 2011. He was waived on October 22.

Carolina Panthers
Shirley signed on to the Carolina Panthers' practice squad on November 8, 2011. Shirley was promoted from the practice squad on December 7, 2011. He played in the final four games for the Panthers, recording four tackles, 2.5 sacks, and one forced-fumble.

Indianapolis Colts
Shirley signed with the Indianapolis Colts on July 19, 2012. He was released by the Colts on August 31.

Washington Redskins
Shirley was signed to the practice squad of the Washington Redskins on September 3, 2012. He was released on September 11.

Arizona Rattlers
Shirley was placed on league suspension during the Arizona Rattlers ArenaBowl XXVI championship victory.

Los Angeles Kiss
Shirley was assigned to the Los Angeles Kiss on February 23, 2014.

WWE tryout
On October 28, 2014, Shirley was mentioned as a participant of tryout in WWE Performance Center.

Personal life
In November 2008, a Fresno (Calif.) County judge sentenced Shirley to 30 days in a work program after a jury found him guilty of drunken driving and hit and run.

References

External links
Cincinnati Bengals bio
Fresno State Bulldogs bio

1985 births
Living people
People from Fontana, California
Players of American football from California
American football offensive linemen
American football defensive tackles
Fresno State Bulldogs football players
Cincinnati Bengals players
Seattle Seahawks players
Sportspeople from San Bernardino County, California
Carolina Panthers players
Arizona Rattlers players
Los Angeles Kiss players